José Pamplona Lecuanda (born February 6, 1911, date of death unknown) was a Mexican basketball player. He competed in the 1936 Summer Olympics. Born in San Luis Potosí, Pamplona was part of the Mexican basketball team that won the bronze medal. He played in one match.

References

External links
José Pamplona's profile at databaseOlympics.com
XI JUEGOS OLIMPICOS BERLIN 1936 BRONCE | EQUIPO DE BALONCESTO 

1911 births
Year of death missing
Basketball players at the 1936 Summer Olympics
Mexican men's basketball players
Olympic basketball players of Mexico
Olympic bronze medalists for Mexico
Basketball players from Zacatecas
People from Zacatecas City
Olympic medalists in basketball
Medalists at the 1936 Summer Olympics